The spot-backed antwren (Herpsilochmus dorsimaculatus) is a species of bird in the family Thamnophilidae. It is found in Brazil, Colombia, and Venezuela. Its natural habitat is subtropical or tropical moist lowland forests.

The spot-backed antwren was described by the Austrian ornithologist August von Pelzeln in 1868 and given its current binomial name Herpsilochmus dorsimaculatus.

References

spot-backed antwren
Birds of the Amazon Basin
Birds of the Colombian Amazon
Birds of the Venezuelan Amazon
spot-backed antwren
Taxonomy articles created by Polbot